Shane Stafford (born March 14, 1976) is a former arena football quarterback and coach. He was signed by the Tallahassee Thunder as a street free agent in 2000. He played college football at Connecticut.

Prior to signing with Orlando, he played with the Tampa Bay Storm for five seasons. Stafford holds Storm single-season records for completions (408), passing yards (4,793) and touchdown passes (86) and career marks for completions (1,357), passing yards (15,667) and touchdown passes (289). Stafford also played for the Tallahassee Thunder of af2, and the Scottish Claymores in NFL Europe. He was the offensive coordinator for the Atlantic City Blackjacks of the Arena Football League (AFL) in 2019.

Early years
Stafford attended Wilson High School in West Lawn, Pennsylvania, where he starred in both football and basketball.  In 2005 he was inducted into the Wilson High School Athletic Hall of Fame for his accomplishments.

College career
At the University of Connecticut, Stafford finished his college career as the second in career passing yards (8,975), attempts (1,026), completions (563) and total offense (8,829) in school history. He is also tied as the school's all-time touchdown passing leader with 73, had a passer rating of 143.4 which is the best in school history.

Career AFL statistics

External links
 Orlando Predators bio
 Shane Stafford at ArenaFan.com
 Shane Stafford's 2003 Scottish Calymores Stats

1976 births
Living people
People from Sinking Spring, Pennsylvania
Players of American football from Pennsylvania
American football quarterbacks
UConn Huskies football players
Scottish Claymores players
Tampa Bay Storm players
Orlando Predators players
Dallas Vigilantes players
Tampa Bay Storm coaches
Washington Valor coaches
Atlantic City Blackjacks coaches